Sehnsa Tehsil is a large Tehsil in Pakistan Administered Azad Kashmir which lies on the west of Gulpur on the Kotli-Rawalpindi road.  Sehnsa is a sub-divisional (Tehsil) headquarters of Kotli district in the center of Sehnsa valley.

2005 earthquake

On October 8, 2005 this city also felt strong shocks but no damage occurred. On the same day the NGO (Khidmat Khalq Trust) went to the affected areas of AJK. it was the first NGO to reach the Bagh district to help the affected people. This NGO remained for almost six months and helped build homes. People of Sehnsa also participated in helping.

Religion
The majority of the population are Muslim.

References

External links
Mangral
 Aerial Photo of Shensa City

Populated places in Kotli District
Tehsils of Kotli District